The Czech Social Democratic Party (ČSSD) leadership election of 2017 was held on 10 March 2017, prior October 2017 legislative elections. The current leader and Prime Minister of the Czech Republic Bohuslav Sobotka was the only candidate.

Background
According to Hospodářské Noviny Sobotka said that he would seek another term as the leader of ČSSD only if the party succeeded in the 2016 regional and Senate elections, defining success as the ČSSD remaining the strongest party at the regional level and in the Senate. The se words were late commented as misinterpreted. When the ČSSD was defeated in both sets of elections, speculation began that the Governor of South Bohemia Jiří Zimola would run against Sobotka due to his performance in the regional elections and his criticism of Sobotka, saying that Sobotka should reconsider his candidature for leadership. Zimola also stated that he thought Sobotka could remain Prime Minister until the 2017 elections even if the ČSSD was led by someone else. Zimola later said that he would not run for the party leadership as he did not want to divide the party. Sobotka was endorsed by 12 regional organisations of the party. South Bohemian organisation refused to support Sobotka's candidature.

Result
Bohuskav Sobotka won 67% votes from 681 delegates and was reelected. Even though Sobotka was reelected the result was considered a proof of low support for his politics in the party even though he stated that he believes he has a strong mandate.

References

Social Democratic Party leadership election
Social Democratic Party leadership election
Indirect elections
Single-candidate elections
Czech Social Democratic Party leadership election
Czech Social Democratic Party leadership election